Custoca (also Custoka), was a low-volume Austrian car manufacturer established by Gerhard Höller in 1966 to build and sell kit cars. Models included the Ford GT40-inspired Hurrycane introduced in 1971, the Lamborghini-like Strato, and, beginning in 1972, a range of dune buggies based on the popular Volkswagen Beetle. After 135 Stratos, and approximately 100 Hurrycanes were produced and sold, the company folded in 1988.

External links
 Custoca History (German Text)

Vehicle manufacturing companies established in 1966
Vehicle manufacturing companies disestablished in 1988
Kit car manufacturers
Car manufacturers of Austria
Austrian companies established in 1966
Defunct motor vehicle manufacturers of Austria